A Dog in Space (Spanish: Un perro en órbita) is a 1966 Spanish film directed by Antonio del Amo and Antonio Román.

Cast
 Pastor Serrador 
 César Raúl Martínez
 Ángel Luis Nolías 
 Inmaculada Pérez
 José Carabias
 Adolfo Torrado

References

Bibliography 
 de España, Rafael. Directory of Spanish and Portuguese film-makers and films. Greenwood Press, 1994.

External links 
 

1966 films
Spanish science fiction films
1960s Spanish-language films
Films directed by Antonio del Amo
1960s Spanish films